Lasan de Silva (born 6 July 1983) is a Sri Lankan cricketer. He made his Twenty20 debut for Police Sports Club in the 2018–19 SLC Twenty20 Tournament on 15 February 2019. He made his List A debut on 14 December 2019, for Police Sports Club in the 2019–20 Invitation Limited Over Tournament.

References

External links
 

1983 births
Living people
Sri Lankan cricketers
Sri Lanka Police Sports Club cricketers
Place of birth missing (living people)